Diarmuid Lyng (born 1981 in Wexford, Ireland) is an Irish sportsperson. He plays hurling and Gaelic football with his local club St Martin's and was a member of the Wexford senior inter-county hurling team from 2004 to 2013. His nickname "Gizzy" was acquired in his childhood and is a reference to the character Gizmo from the movie Gremlins. A graduate of Froebel College of Education, Lyng is a primary school teacher.

Playing career

Club
Lyng plays both hurling and Gaelic football with his local club St Martin's in Piercestown and has experienced much success.

In 1999 Lyng was still a member of the clubs minor team when he made his senior debut as a seventeen-year-old.  He was a non-playing substitute when St Martin's defeated Rathnure by two points to win their very first county championship.

After losing a final in the meantime St Martin's were back in the championship decider in 2008. A 1-13 to 1-8 defeat of Oulart-the-Ballagh gave Lyng his first county title on the field of play.

He later joined Kerry side Tralee Parnells

Inter-county
Lyng first came to prominence with Wexford as a member of the county's minor team in 1999.  He enjoyed little success in this grade having lost a Leinster decider to Kilkenny.  He later joined the Wexford under-21 team, winning back-to-back Leinster titles in 2001 and 2002.

Lyng made his senior debut for Wexford in a National Hurling League game against Kilkenny in 2004.  He remained on the fringes of the team and was a non-playing substitute when Wexford captured the Leinster title.  He made his championship debut later that year when he came on as a substitute against Cork in the All-Ireland semi-final.

By 2005 Lyng was a regular on the Wexford starting fifteen, however, the Slanysliders had to play second fiddle to Kilkenny in the provincial championship.  Lyng lined out in four Leinster finals in-a-row, however, Kilkenny were the winners on all four occasions.

In 2009 Lyng was appointed Wexford captain.  He retained that position in 2010 and guided the team to a National League Division 2 title following a defeat of Clare.

Inter-provincial
Lyng has lined out with Leinster on a number of occasions in the inter-provincial series.  He won two Railway Cup medals in 2006 and 2009.

Post-playing career
After a spiritual awakening, Lyng moved to Corca Dhuibhne and co-founded Wild Irish with his partner, poet 
Siobhán de Paor. Wild Irish endeavors to assist their compatriots with mental health and societal stress by spending time in nature with Ireland's indigenous language, Gaeilge.

Lyng narrated the documentary Réabhlóid GAA, which TG4 premiered in December 2020.

Honours
 2 Leinster Under-21 Hurling Championship 2001 2002
 2 Railway Cup 2006 2009
 1 Leinster Senior Hurling Championship 2004
 1 National Hurling League Division 1 2010
 1 Wexford Senior Hurling Championship 2008

References

1981 births
Living people
Dual players
Irish schoolteachers
St Martin's (Wexford) hurlers
St Martin's (Wexford) Gaelic footballers
Wexford inter-county hurlers
Leinster inter-provincial hurlers